The genus Tacca, which includes the batflowers and arrowroot, consists of flowering plants in the order Dioscoreales, native to tropical regions of South America, Africa, Australia, Southeast Asia, and various Oceanic islands. In older texts, the genus was treated in its own family Taccaceae, but the 2003 APG II system incorporates it into the family Dioscoreaceae. The APG III and APG IV systems continue to include Tacca in Dioscoreaceae.

Description 
Many Tacca species have nearly black flowers, with conspicuous involucral bracts and  bracteoles like whiskers. Engbert Drenth hypothesized that species of this genus attracted "carrion and dung flies" for pollination and that the fleshy seam of the seed might be attractive to ants and hence that ants might aid in seed dispersal.

Taxonomy 
Earlier classifications placed the genus within the monogeneric family Taccaceae, which in turn was the sole family in the order Taccales. Dahlgren recognised the similarities to the genera within the Dioscoreales, and incorporated the family into that order.

Subdivision 
There are at least 16 species, 
 Tacca ampliplacenta L.Zhang & Q.J.Li - Yunnan
 Tacca ankaranensis Bard.-Vauc., 1997 - Madagascar
 Tacca bibracteata Drenth - Sarawak
 Tacca borneensis Ridl. - Borneo
 Tacca celebica Koord. - Sulawesi
 Tacca chantrieri André, 1901 - Indochina, Assam, Bangladesh, Tibet, Guangdong, Guangxi, Guizhou, Hainan, Hunan, Yunnan 
 Tacca ebeltajae  Drenth - Papua New Guinea, Solomon Islands
 Tacca integrifolia Ker Gawl., 1812 - Tibet, Bhutan, Assam, Bangladesh, Indochina, India, Pakistan, Java, Malaysia, Sumatra, Borneo
 Tacca leontopetaloides (L.) Kuntze, 1891 - widespread across tropical Africa, Madagascar, Indian Subcontinent, Southeast Asia, New Guinea, Australia, and various islands of the Indian and Pacific Oceans
 Tacca maculata  Seem., 1866 - Western Australia,  Northern Territory, Fiji, Samoa
 Tacca palmata Blume - Indonesia, Indochina, Malaysia, Philippines, New Guinea
 Tacca palmatifida Baker - Sulawesi
 Tacca parkeri Seem. - South America
 Tacca plantaginea (Hance) Drenth, 1972 - Indochina, southern China
 Tacca reducta P.C.Boyce & S.Julia - Sarawak, Borneo, Malesia
 Tacca subflabellata P.P. Ling & C.T. Ting, 1982 - Yunnan
 Synonyms:
 Tacca lanceolata Spruce - Brazil, Venezuela = Tacca parkeri Seem.

Cultivation
Several species are cultivated as ornamental plants for their bold foliage and large flowers. The well-known T. chantrieri goes by the names of black batflower, bat-head lily, devil flower or cat's whiskers. Tacca integrifolia is known as the purple or white batflower. Other cultivated varieties include the arrowroot, T. leontopetaloides, and T. cristata aspera.

Gallery

References

Bibliography 

 
 Germplasm Resources Information Network: Tacca
 Taccaceae in L. Watson and M.J. Dallwitz (1992 onwards), The families of flowering plants 
 Huxley, A., ed. (1992). New RHS Dictionary of Gardening. Macmillan.

Dioscoreaceae
Dioscoreales genera